Dallas Black Pride (also known as Dallas Southern Pride) is an annual five-day event to celebrate the emerging black LGBT community in the Dallas-Fort Worth Metroplex. The event has been in existence since 1996.  It is held in conjunction with the State Fair of Texas  and State Fair Classic in Dallas every fall (late September/early October). Dallas Her Pride is the official women's host of Dallas Black Pride. Annually, about 15,000 people participate in the planned pride events, making it the largest black gay pride event in Texas and one of the largest in the nation.

Juneteenth Weekend
Juneteenth Weekend is traditionally the first black gay pride event of the year in Dallas.  As with the black pride event in the fall, there are many locals and visitors participating in the special events and celebrations empowering the black LGBT community in the Dallas-Fort Worth metroplex.

See also 
 African Americans in Dallas-Ft. Worth
 LGBT culture in Dallas–Fort Worth
African-American LGBT community
Black gay pride

References

External links
DSP website
Dallas Her Pride
History of DBP Movement

African-American festivals
Festivals in Dallas
Pride parades in Texas
African-American history of Texas
African-American_LGBT_organizations
LGBT African-American culture
State Fair of Texas